Podaechmea is a subgenus of the genus Aechmea.

Species
Species accepted by Encyclopedia of Bromeliads as of October 2022:

Aechmea aenigmatica 
Aechmea baudoensis 
Aechmea ferruginea 
Aechmea haltonii 
Aechmea lueddemanniana 
Aechmea mexicana

References

Plant subgenera